Transnational may refer to:
 Transnational company
 Transnational crime
 Transnational feminism
 Transnational governance
 Transnationality
 Transnational marriage
 Transnational organization
 Transnational organized crime
 Transnational political party
 Transnational progressivism
 Transnational psychology
 Transnational (VNV Nation album)

See also
 International (disambiguation)
 Multinational (disambiguation)
 Supranational (disambiguation)
 Subnational (disambiguation)
 National (disambiguation)